Preserje is a small settlement in the Municipality of Braslovče in northern Slovenia. It lies on the Savinja River just east of Braslovče. The area is part of the traditional region of Lower Styria. The municipality is now included in the Savinja Statistical Region.

References

External links
Preserje on Geopedia

Populated places in the Municipality of Braslovče